The Embassy of Mongolia in Moscow is the chief diplomatic mission of Mongolia in the Russian Federation. It is located at 11 Borisoglebsky Lane in Moscow. The current ambassador is U.Enkhtuvshin, who presented his credentials in September 2022.

See also
 Mongolia–Russia relations
 Diplomatic missions in Russia

References

External links
  Embassy of Mongolia in Moscow

Mongolia–Russia relations
Mongolia
Moscow
Arbat District
Mongolia–Soviet Union relations